Fevik is a Seaside resort and village in Grimstad municipality in Agder county, Norway. The village of Vik lies just southwest of Fevik.

The  village of Fevik has a population (2015) of about 5,300 people, with most working in Arendal or central Grimstad. Since 2014, Fevik has been considered part of the "urban area" of Arendal by Statistics Norway.

The European route E18 runs just to the north of the village area and the Norwegian County Road 420 runs through the village. Fevik Church is located in the village.

History
Fevik was a major summer tourist area from 1930 until about 1960. A large area at the northwest end of Fevik has some very interesting natural features (geological, plant, and insect) and it was made into a national nature reserve area.

At the end of the 19th century, the biggest shipyard in northern Europe for iron hulls were in the bay of Fevikkilen. Some boatbuilders are still in the area, making modern cruisers and traditional wooden boats.

References

Villages in Agder
Seaside resorts in Norway
Grimstad